Zvolenská Slatina is a village and municipality of the Zvolen District in the Banská Bystrica Region of central Slovakia.

History
In historical records the village was first mentioned in 1263.

Geography
The village lies at an altitude of 340 metres and covers an area of 45.938 km². It has a population of 2,671 people.

People
 Terézia Vansová, writer
 Ján Bahýľ, inventor
 Roland Grapow, musician

Villages and municipalities in Zvolen District